Frei Miguelinho is a city in Pernambuco, Brazil.

Geography
 State - Pernambuco
 Region - Agreste Pernambucano
 Boundaries - Santa Maria do Cambucá (N); Caruaru and Riacho das Almas (S); Surubim (E); Vertentes (W)
 Area - 212.7 km2
 Elevation - 370 m
 Hydrography - Capibaribe River
 Vegetation - Caatinga hipoxerófila
 Climate - semi-arid, hot
 Annual average temperature - 23.9 c
 Distance to Recife - 166 km
 Population - 15,546 (2020)

Economy
The main economic activities in Frei Miguelinho are based in agribusiness, especially the raising of cattle, goats, sheep and chickens.

Economic indicators

Economy by sector

Health indicators

References

Municipalities in Pernambuco